Frankfort is a city in Marshall County, Kansas, United States.  As of the 2020 census, the population of the city was 730.

History
Frankfort was laid out in 1867 when the Central Branch Union Pacific Railroad was built through the area. The nearby post office of Nottingham, established in 1857, moved roughly a half-mile northwest to meet the railroad. It was named for Frank Schmidt, a member of the town company. Frankfort was incorporated as a city of the third class in 1875.

The town lost 32 men during World War II, more per capita than any other community in the USA.

Geography
Frankfort is located at  (39.703810, -96.417925).

Demographics

2010 census
As of the census of 2010, there were 726 people, 307 households, and 195 families residing in the city. The racial makeup of the city was 98.8% White, 0.6% African American, 0.1% Asian, and 0.6% from two or more races. Hispanic or Latino of any race were 1.2% of the population.

There were 307 households, of which 26.7% had children under the age of 18 living with them, 54.1% were married couples living together, 7.5% had a female householder with no husband present, 2.0% had a male householder with no wife present, and 36.5% were non-families. 33.2% of all households were made up of individuals, and 20.8% had someone living alone who was 65 years of age or older. The average household size was 2.22 and the average family size was 2.80.

The median age in the city was 47.7 years. 21.5% of residents were under the age of 18; 5.4% were between the ages of 18 and 24; 21.3% were from 25 to 44; 23.3% were from 45 to 64; and 28.4% were 65 years of age or older. The gender makeup of the city was 48.9% male and 51.1% female.

2000 census
As of the census of 2000, there were 855 people, 367 households, and 230 families residing in the city. The racial makeup of the city was 98.25% White, 0.35% African American, 0.12% Native American, 0.12% Pacific Islander, and 1.17% from two or more races. Hispanic or Latino of any race were 0.35% of the population.

There were 367 households, out of which 24.8% had children under the age of 18 living with them, 55.0% were married couples living together, 4.4% had a female householder with no husband present, and 37.1% were non-families. 34.3% of all households were made up of individuals, and 24.5% had someone living alone who was 65 years of age or older. The average household size was 2.19 and the average family size was 2.81.

In the city, the population was spread out, with 20.2% under the age of 18, 8.0% from 18 to 24, 18.7% from 25 to 44, 19.5% from 45 to 64, and 33.6% who were 65 years of age or older. The median age was 46 years. For every 100 females, there were 88.3 males. For every 100 females age 18 and over, there were 85.8 males.

The median income for a household in the city was $28,269, and the median income for a family was $34,545. Males had a median income of $25,167 versus $19,375 for females. The per capita income for the city was $16,078. About 6.8% of families and 10.5% of the population were below the poverty line, including 11.3% of those under age 18 and 16.7% of those age 65 or over.

Education
The community is served by Vermilion USD 380 public school district.

The Frankfort Wildcats won the Kansas State High School boys basketball class 2A championship in 1973 and the class 1A DII championship in 2012. Frankfort football teams have brought home state titles in 1983 in Class 1A, as well as 1996 in Class 2-1A. Both teams were coached by Larry Schroeder, a member of the KSHSAA Hall of Fame. Frankfort also won the 1A volleyball state championship in both 1986 and 2009.

References

Further reading

External links
 
 City of Frankfort
 Frankfort - Directory of Public Officials
 USD 380, local school district
 Frankfort city map, KDOT

Cities in Kansas
Cities in Marshall County, Kansas
Populated places established in 1867
1867 establishments in Kansas